Jahron Anthony Brathwaite (born July 3, 1993), known professionally as PartyNextDoor (stylized as PARTYNEXTDOOR), is a Canadian singer, songwriter, and record producer. 

PartyNextDoor was the first artist signed to Drake's OVO Sound record label in 2013, in a joint-venture with Warner Records. He then released his first EP self-titled PartyNextDoor later that year. He subsequently released PartyNextDoor Two and PNDColours in 2014 and PartyNextDoor 3 in 2016. He has also seen success as a songwriter, having penned "Work", which was released on Rihanna's album Anti and peaked at number-one on the Billboard Hot 100 and become one of the most successful songs of the year, along with "Wild Thoughts" which peaked at number 2 on the Billboard Hot 100.

Early life
Jahron Anthony Brathwaite was born to a Jamaican mother and a Trinidadian father in Mississauga, Ontario. He was inspired by the music his father played to him when he was younger such as Jodeci, Boyz II Men, Blackstreet and 112.

Career

2007–2014: Career beginnings and debut album
Having made electronic-infused R&B under his real name Jahron Brathwaite [Jahron B],  he signed a publishing deal with Warner/Chappell as a songwriter, under the name PartyNextDoor, at age 18. His first mixtape, PartyNextDoor, was released to the iTunes Store on July 1, 2013. It entered on the Billboard Heatseekers Albums chart at number six with sales of 2,000 copies and peaked at number 34 on the Top R&B/Hip-Hop Albums chart for the week of July 20, 2013. He performed background vocals on "Own It" and "Come Thru" from Drake's third studio album, Nothing Was the Same.

His debut studio album PartyNextDoor Two was released on July 30, 2014. The record featured singles like "Thirsty", "FWU", "East Liberty" and the Billboard charted "Recognize", featuring Drake. Later that year, on December 3, 2014, PartyNextDoor released the four-track EP titled PNDColours, with the follow up COLOURS 2, released in 2017. In 2015, he produced three songs on Drake's If You're Reading This It's Too Late: "Legend", "Preach" and "Wednesday Night Interlude".

2016–present: PartyNextDoor 3, Partymobile and Partypack

PartyNextDoor earned his first number-one song as a songwriter when on January 27, 2016, Rihanna released the lead single "Work" from her eighth studio album, Anti. The song maintained its spot at number-one on the Billboard Hot 100 for nine consecutive weeks. He also penned the song "Sex with Me" on the same album. On March 25, 2016, PartyNextDoor released "Come and See Me", which features fellow artist Drake, from his upcoming second studio album, PartyNextDoor 3 (also known as P3). A music video directed by affiliate and collaborator Adrian Martinez and featuring appearances by Kylie Jenner, Big Sean, and Jhené Aiko was released on Snapchat on June 23, 2016. On June 15, 2016, Jeremih called into Real 92.3 LA to announce a joint album with PartyNextDoor called Late Night Party. On July 2, 2016, he released another single, "Like That", featuring Jeremih and Lil Wayne, on OVO Sound radio. On July 21, 2016, PartyNextDoor announced the release date for his second studio album PartyNextDoor 3 for August 12, 2016, and released "Not Nice", the record's second single.

He and Jeremih toured in 2016 and had plans to release a joint project.

On June 4, 2017, PartyNextDoor released Colours 2 without any prior announcement. A short film for the EP was released on June 12, 2017.

On September 29, 2017, he released an EP titled Seven Days, which included guest appearances from Halsey and Rick Ross.

After a lead artist hiatus PartyNextDoor returned in December 2019 with two singles "The News" and "Loyal", with the latter featuring Drake. They served as the lead singles of his album Partymobile which he tweeted would be released in February. The album was eventually released on March 27, 2020, following delays.

On October 15, 2020, Party surprise-announced the release of Partypack, a seven-song EP containing previously unreleased songs like the 2014 song "Persian Rugs". The EP was released the following day.

On January 29, 2021, Party released his 2014 EP, Colours, to streaming services for the first time. It includes four extra tracks that were previously released as Colours 2 in 2017.

Discography 

 PartyNextDoor Two (2014)
 PartyNextDoor 3 (2016)
 Partymobile (2020)

Awards and nominations

References

External links 

 

1993 births
Living people
21st-century Black Canadian male singers
21st-century Canadian rappers
Alternative R&B musicians
Ambient musicians
Canadian contemporary R&B singers
Canadian hip hop record producers
Canadian hip hop singers
Canadian people of Jamaican descent
Canadian people of Trinidad and Tobago descent
Canadian songwriters
Chillwave musicians
Lo-fi musicians
Musicians from Mississauga
Neo soul singers
OVO Sound artists
Dancehall musicians